The Czech Republic will compete at the 2009 World Championships in Athletics from 15–23 August. A team of 22 athletes was announced in preparation for the competition. Selected athletes have achieved one of the competition's qualifying standards. Decathlete Roman Šebrle and javelin thrower Barbora Špotáková enter the competition as the reigning champions and current world record holders.

Team selection

Track and road events

Field and combined events

Results

Men
Track and road events

Field events

Women
Track and road events

Field and combined events

References

External links
Official competition website

Nations at the 2009 World Championships in Athletics
World Championships in Athletics
2009